Steve Daskewisz (March 14, 1944 – December 18, 2018), also known as Steve Dash or Steve Daskawisz, was an American actor and stunt double from New York City, New York. Dash was known for his role as a stunt double for the serial killer Jason Voorhees in the film Friday the 13th Part 2.

Life and career
A former cop, Dash began working as a stuntman and actor beginning in 1977. He had small roles in Wolfen and The Jazz Singer. That led to work on Sylvester Stallone's Nighthawks, where he met Cliff Cudney. Cudney hired him to replace Warrington Gillette, who was originally scheduled to play Jason in Friday the 13th Part 2. Daskewisz died on December 18, 2018, at the age of 74 due to diabetes-related complications.

Filmography

References

External links
 

1944 births
2018 deaths
20th-century American male actors
American male film actors
Place of birth missing